The 1975–76 Illinois Fighting Illini men's basketball team represented the University of Illinois.

Regular season

During the 1975-76 season, Illinois finished seventh in the Big Ten going went 14-13 overall. Lou Henson took over the team as head coach. Henson moved to the University of Illinois to replace Gene Bartow, after Bartow left Illinois to replace John Wooden at UCLA. Henson would lead the Fighting Illini to the 1989 Final Four. In 21 years at Illinois, Henson garnered 423 wins and 224 losses (.654 winning percentage), and with a record of 214 wins and 164 losses (.567) in Big Ten Conference games. The 214 wins in Big Ten games were the third highest total ever at the time of his retirement.

This marked the first time since 1919 that a Big Ten basketball team would finish the season undefeated.  This also marked the second time a Big Ten team would finish with 30 or more wins.

Roster

Source

Schedule
																																																
Source																																																																																																
																																																
|-																																																
!colspan=12 style="background:#DF4E38; color:white;"| Non-Conference regular season
	
	
	
	
	
	
	
	
	
|-
!colspan=9 style="background:#DF4E38; color:#FFFFFF;"|Big Ten regular season
	
	
	
	
	
	
	
	
	
	
	
	
	
	
	
	
	
	
|-

Player stats

Awards and honors
Nate Williams
Team Most Valuable Player

Team players drafted into the NBA

Rankings

References

Illinois Fighting Illini
Illinois Fighting Illini men's basketball seasons
1975 in sports in Illinois
1976 in sports in Illinois